The Confederate Women's Monument was an outdoor memorial by J. Maxwell Miller, installed in Baltimore, in the U.S. state of Maryland in 1917.

The statue was removed in August 2017. At the August 14, 2017, City Council session, they also voted unanimously to remove the Stonewall Jackson and Robert E. Lee Monument, the Confederate Soldiers and Sailors Monument and the Roger B. Taney Sculpture.

See also
 List of Confederate monuments and memorials
 List of public art in Baltimore
 Memorial to Women of the Confederacy, Richmond, Virginia
 Removal of Confederate monuments and memorials

References

External links
 

1917 establishments in Maryland
1917 sculptures
Confederate States of America monuments and memorials in Maryland
Outdoor sculptures in Baltimore
Relocated buildings and structures in Maryland
Removed Confederate States of America monuments and memorials
Sculptures of women in Maryland
Statues in Maryland
Monuments and memorials to women